The Diocese of Buea is a Latin Church diocese located in the city of Buea in the Ecclesiastical province of Bamenda in Cameroon.

On January 5, 2021, Bishop Michael Miabesue Bibi, auxiliary bishop of the Archdiocese of Bamenda, was appointed Bishop of this diocese. He had been its Apostolic Administrator since December 28, 2019.

History
 June 12, 1923: Established as Apostolic Prefecture of Buea from Apostolic Vicariate of Cameroun
 March 15, 1939: Promoted as Apostolic Vicariate of Buea
 April 18, 1950: Promoted as Diocese of Buea

Leadership 
Apostolic Prefects
 Father John William Campling, M.H.M. (August 6, 1923  – May 13, 1925)
 Father Peter Rogan, M.H.M. (June 26, 1925  – March 15, 1939)
Apostolic Vicars
 Bishop Peter Rogan, M.H.M. (March 15, 1939  – April 18, 1950)
 Bishops
 Bishop Peter Rogan, M.H.M. (April 18, 1950  – August 18, 1961)
 Bishop Julius Joseph Willem Peeters, M.H.M. (June 4, 1962  – January 29, 1973)
 Bishop Pius Suh Awa (January 29, 1973  – November 30, 2006)
 Bishop Emmanuel Bushu (November 30, 2006  – December 28, 2019)
 Bishop Michael Miabesue Bibi (January 5, 2021 – present)

Coadjutor bishops
Pius Suh Awa (1971-1973)

Other priests of this diocese who became bishops
George Nkuo, appointed Bishop of Kumbo in 2006
Andrew Nkea Fuanya, appointed Coadjutor Bishop of Mamfe in 2013

See also
Roman Catholicism in Cameroon

References

External links
 GCatholic.org
 

Buea
Christian organizations established in 1923
Roman Catholic dioceses and prelatures established in the 20th century
Roman Catholic Ecclesiastical Province of Bamenda